Gordonia phosphorivorans is a Gram-positive and non-spore-forming bacterium from the genus Gordonia which has been isolated from a wastewater treatment bioreactor in Aachen in Germany.

References

External links
Type strain of Gordonia phosphorivorans at BacDive -  the Bacterial Diversity Metadatabase	

Mycobacteriales
Bacteria described in 2013